Jasper Jacks is a fictional character from General Hospital, an American soap opera on the ABC network. He has been portrayed off-and-on by actor Ingo Rademacher since 1996. The role was temporarily played by Gideon Emery during Rademacher's absence in January 2008. Jack gained popularity due to the love triangle involving him and supercouple Sonny Corinthos and Brenda Barrett. When Brenda left the show, it continued on with Sonny and Carly Benson. Sonny and Jax became enemies due to their frequent affections for the same woman. Jax has left the show numerous times, but for the most part has been a steady presence since his debut.

Casting and character creation
The role of Jasper "Jax" Jacks was originated by German-born Australian actor Ingo Rademacher, who debuted in the role on January 31, 1996. In April 2000, Rademacher announced his decision to not sign a new contract with the series, and would vacate the role of Jasper. On his departure, Rademacher said in a statement, "I haven't really built up my resumé. I think [daytime] was a good move. And especially being on General Hospital, the best daytime show, I think. But there are other things I'd like to do." Following his departure, the actor signed onto the NBC primetime series, Titans. In April 2001, it was rumored that Rademacher would make his way back to General Hospital, despite being interested in the role of "Colin" on the NBC Daytime soap opera Days of Our Lives, a potential love interest of the character Jennifer Horton (Melissa Reeves). That month, further speculation led many to believe that Rademacher would return to his daytime home following the cancellation of Titans and his rumored deal with Days of our Lives failing to provide any truth. It was later confirmed that Rademacher was to return to the series in June 2001. He returned on-screen July 30, 2001.

In September 2004, following his being quoted as being "burned out", Rademacher was rumored to be making an exit from his daytime home once again, however the rumors turned out to be false. In May 2011, it was announced that Rademacher had been fired from the series following a noticeable decline in Jasper's airtime on the series. Rademacher last aired in July 2011, before returning in August in what he stated was expected to be the first of many guest appearances on the series.

In November 2011, it was announced by ABC that Rademacher would make another scheduled guest appearance on the series, this time lasting three weeks. Rademacher returned on December 30, 2011, and left the series once again on January 23, 2012.

In August 2012, following the surprising return of Jerry Jacks (Sebastian Roché), it was announced that Rademacher would once again make a return to the series in the role of Jasper Jacks. Rademacher made his on-screen return on August 23, 2012. He finished his guest series the following month, making his final appearance on September 26, 2012.

Rademacher, along with co-star Vanessa Marcil, was invited back for the show's 50th anniversary. An official announcement was made on March 5, 2013. He appeared back on-screen on April 1, 2013. On June 2, 2016, TVLine broke news that Rademacher would return to the soap under recurring capacity; he was expected to first appear on July 29, but due to preemptions, Rademacher returned on August 1 and departed weeks later on August 16. Rademacher returned yet again from November 10 to 28, 2016. In March 2017, Frank Valentini confirmed that Rademacher would, again, reprise his portrayal as Jasper Jacks. He returned from April 3–24, 2017.

On February 14, 2019, Rademacher announced in a video shared on social media that he would return as Jax; he made his first re-appearance during the May 7, 2019, episode. On November 8, 2021, following increased speculation, it was announced Rademacher was let go from the soap; his last air-date was November 22, 2021.

Storylines

1990s 
Jasper "Jax" Jacks arrives in Port Charles, New York, at the behest of Lois Cerullo (Rena Sofer) to help her get her company back from Edward Quartermaine. Despite Lois's happy marriage to Ned Ashton (Wally Kurth), Jax pursues her romantically. To keep Jax occupied, Lois introduces him to her best friend Brenda Barrett (Vanessa Marcil), who uses Jax to make her mobster ex-boyfriend Sonny Corinthos (Maurice Benard) jealous. Despite her love for Sonny, Brenda develops feelings for Jax, and the two eventually wed on his private yacht. When the two decide to renew their vows, Sonny interrupts the ceremony by bringing in Jax's former wife, Miranda Jamison (Leslie Horan), who revealed her death had been faked to hide scars she suffered in the explosion. Jax ultimately decides to move on with Brenda, who has become engaged to Sonny. Brenda, who has been battling an addiction to pain killers, is left at the altar by Sonny in an attempt to protect her from the dangers of mafia life, and Jax helps her recover from her eventual breakdown. The two become engaged yet again, though Brenda appears to die when her mental mother drives her over a cliff.

2000s 
Jax learns that his father and brother Jerry Jacks (played by Julian Stone at the time) started the family empire with mafia money, and they lose all of their wealth. After gambling in Monte Carlo, Jax begins to rebuild his fortune and also meets fashion designer Chloe Morgan (Tava Smiley). Chloe is in danger of losing her design company, and must be happily married to retain the seed money her eccentric uncle left her. She plans to marry a now divorced Ned in Las Vegas, and when Chloe's aunt Gertrude objects, Jax marries his best friend and Ned's love interest Alexis Davis (Nancy Lee Grahn) to help cover the ruse. Though Chloe eventually loses her company, she and Jax grow closer. Eventually they fall in love and Jax buys her company back. Chloe is severely injured when Helena Cassadine (Constance Towers) runs her over in an attempt to kill Alexis. Chloe develops psychic visions tied to Helena, and Stefan Cassadine (Stephen Nichols) intends to use these to help destroy his devious mother, Helena. Stefan shows Jax a woman who looks just like Brenda, and Jax leaves Port Charles in search of his former love.

While searching for Brenda, Jax meets Kristina Cassadine (Jaime Ray Newman) and he realizes that she is Alexis's sister and reunites them. Chloe refuses his advances when she learns he left her to pursue Brenda. Stavros Cassadine (Robert Kelker-Kelly) murders Chloe, who has become involved with Stefan, leaving Jax heartbroken. Returning to corporate raiding, Jax teams up with Skye Chandler Quartermaine (Robin Christopher) and her brother  (Billy Warlock) to take over ELQ, their family company, and to destroy Sonny. Jax also goes into business with Carly Corinthos (played by Tamara Braun at the time), Sonny's wife, to open a nightclub in an attempt to free her from the mafia lifestyle. Despite initially disliking Skye, Jax becomes attracted to her, and she in turn plays the damsel in distress to lure him to her. They are both concerned when A.J. becomes involved with Sonny's sister Courtney Matthews (Alicia Leigh Willis). The two briefly split when Jax learns that Skye had been working with Edward behind his back, but they are able to overcome this obstacle and marry.

The night of his wedding to Skye, Jax is shocked to see a very much alive Brenda in his cottage. Brenda explains that she faked her death, fearing that she suffered from the same fatal mental illness as her mother and that she had been taken in by arms dealer Luis Alcazar (Ted King). When she attempts to leave Luis, he shoots Jax, leaving him paralyzed. Depressed over his condition, Jax pushes Skye away and pretends to be in love with Brenda still. Skye learns that Brenda is not dying, and when Jax discovers that she is keeping this information from Brenda, he ends their marriage. Overjoyed, he tells Brenda the truth, and the two become engaged again. Skye begins drinking again and also starts an affair with Luis. When Luis is murdered, Skye implicates Brenda and mobster Jason Morgan (Steve Burton), forcing Brenda and Jason to marry so they cannot be forced to testify against each other. Initially found guilty, Brenda is cleared of the charges when it is revealed that Alexis killed Luis, who was responsible for the death of Kristina, in order to protect her newborn daughter. Once her marriage to Jason is annulled, Brenda and Jax prepare to wed, though Jax leaves her at the altar when he learns that she kissed Sonny the day of their wedding. Brenda leaves town, and Skye again pursues Jax. Unable to recapture their past love, Skye begs him to impregnate her, but Jax chooses to leave town again.

In 2003, Jax returns to town in pursuit of a set of five cards called the Dead Man's Hand, allegedly held by Wild Bill Hickok the night he was killed. Jax's father had them for most of his life, and believed them to be responsible for his success. Upon losing them, his father lost the will to live. As Jax searches, he meets a grifter named Sam McCall (Kelly Monaco) who is also searching for the cards. Initially at odds, the two become attracted to each other while simultaneously sabotaging each other's quest. After they become lovers, Sam steals the cards from Jax. He is unable to return them to his father in time to prevent his death, and blames Sam. After some more adventures, they eventually break up and Sam becomes involved with his enemy Sonny Corinthos.  Jax reconnects with Sam when he briefly suspects he is the father of her unborn child, but the connection ends when Jax learns that his enemy Sonny is actually the father.

Jax begins to flirt with Sonny's sister Courtney, and the two make a ten million dollar bet that she won't be able to resist his sexual advances. Courtney wins the bet, but the two fall in love. Courtney and Jax marry, but learn that Courtney cannot conceive a child. They decide to use Elizabeth Webber (Rebecca Herbst) as a surrogate, though Courtney regrets this as Jax begins neglecting her in favor of Elizabeth and their child. Courtney in turn begins a friendship with Nikolas Cassadine (Tyler Christopher) that turns into an affair. Courtney becomes pregnant, and Jax changes the paternity test to say that he is the father. Courtney gives birth to a son and dies shortly afterwards. Carly (now portrayed by Laura Wright), begins to help Jax raise his son, and the two begin dating. Carly discovers that Jax is not the father, but keeps quiet to protect the baby from the Cassadines. Carly's longtime nemesis, Dr. Robin Scorpio (Kimberly McCullough), learns the truth and reveals it to Nikolas, Jax is then forced to give him the baby who Nikolas names Spencer Cassadine.

Jax and Carly continue their relationship, and eventually become engaged. Their wedding is delayed several times, and Jax is forced to leave town to help his wayward brother Jerry. When Sonny shoots mobster Lorenzo Alcazar (Ted King), Carly marries him to avoid testifying about witnessing the act. After she and Sonny are held hostage at the Metro Court Hotel by the mysterious Mr. Craig, they sleep together and Jax finds out. Jax resolves to fight for Carly, and though initially torn, Carly chooses a life with Jax. Carly and Sonny divorce, and Jax and Carly finally marry. When they return from their honeymoon, Jax learns that Mr. Craig is actually his brother Jerry (now portrayed by Sebastian Roché) who has had plastic surgery. Jerry tricks Jax to go out of town, but his plan backfires when Jax is kidnapped by Jerry's former lover Irina. She rapes Jax twice, though he is able to escape and return to his life with Carly.

Jax begins a new business venture with fashion editor Kate Howard (played by Megan Ward at the time), who Carly immediately dislikes. Jax learns that Kate is actually Connie Falconeri, Sonny's high school girlfriend, and she begins dating Sonny. Carly's son Michael (Dylan Cash), wanting to protect his family, purchases a gun and accidentally shoots Kate. He runs away, leaving Carly, Jax, and Sonny fearful that he has been kidnapped by Anthony Zacchara (Bruce Weitz), a new mafia boss in Port Charles. Meanwhile, Carly and Jax learn she is pregnant. Michael returns to town, but he and Carly are injured in an explosion. Ric Lansing (Rick Hearst) rescues Carly, who suffers from hypothermia. In the hospital, Anthony's daughter Claudia Zacchara (Sarah Joy Brown) threatens Carly in an attempt to protect her brother Johnny Zacchara (Brandon Barash) from Sonny. The stress causes Carly to lose her baby.

Claudia, teamed with Jerry, orders Ian Devlin to kill Sonny but the bullet accidentally hits Michael, leaving him in a permanent coma. On the way to bring Michael to a long-term care facility, Carly and Sonny sleep together, the same night that Kate and Jax, feeling shut out of their partner's lives, share a kiss during a business trip. The two split when Jax learns that Carly slept with Sonny and begin divorce proceedings. Still in love with each other, Jax and Carly reconcile yet again. Sonny marries Claudia in order to take over her family's organization after Kate is shot.

Carly decides to host a gala at General Hospital to raise money for research to help Michael and other children suffering brain injuries. Jax returns from a business meeting to discover Carly and the others have been quarantined due to a biotoxin that has been released in the hospital. When a fire begins engulfing the hospital, Jax is able to make several rescue flights. Carly escapes via stairwell, and the two reunite and renew their wedding vows.

Jerry fakes his death, and begins sending DVDs to Claudia that reveal her role in Michael's shooting. Carly discovers that she is pregnant, and that the pregnancy is extremely high risk. Jax learns the truth about Claudia's misdeeds, and is stunned when Jerry is revealed to be alive. Michael (now portrayed by Drew Garrett) wakes up after an experimental surgery, but faces anger issues and attitude towards his mother.

Sonny learns that Claudia planned the shooting, and Claudia reveals that Jax knew about it and kept it secret from both Carly and Sonny. Claudia then kidnaps a pregnant Carly, who goes into labor and gives birth to daughter Josslyn. Claudia attempts to kidnap the baby, but is bludgeoned to death by Michael. Later, Carly and Jax take the baby home, but Carly, outraged that Jax had known that Claudia and Jerry were behind Michael's shooting all along, throws him out of the house.

2010s 
Sonny is put on trial for Claudia's murder, and Jax helps the police build their case by hiring a cutthroat prosecutor and ensuring the police have enough evidence to hold up in trial. However, Michael's guilt is eventually revealed, and, disgusted by the cover-up of everybody, the judge sentences Michael to five years in prison to teach them a lesson. Jax feels guilty for this, feeling like he's no better than Sonny. Michael is eventually released conditionally, but the events start taking its toll on Carly and Jax's marriage. When Brenda returns to town, Jax confides in her about his worries that Sonny will hurt Josslyn or Morgan one day. Meanwhile, Jerry returns to town, on a mission to kidnap Brenda on behalf of a criminal called The Balkan. Though Jax tries to stop him, Brenda ends up getting kidnapped and poisoned by the Balkan after marrying Sonny. Eventually, she is rescued, and Jerry is presumed dead after being shot by the Balkan.

Jax is worried about Josslyn one night, and brings her to the hospital, where he and Carly find out Josslyn has kidney cancer. While Jax tries to find alternative methods for cures other than chemotherapy, Carly finds out Elizabeth's son, Jake Spencer, was hit by a car and is brain-dead. Elizabeth and Lucky agree to donate one of Jake's kidney's to Josslyn, and she recovers. Carly and Jax file for a divorce, and get into a heated custody battle for Josslyn. Jax wants full custody of his daughter, believing Sonny poses a threat if Carly has any association with him. He goes to great lengths to secure custody, even paying off a court-appointed mediator to throw the case his way. However, Sonny finds out, and has the mediator set Jax up on assault charges, resulting in the judge giving Carly full custody. He leaves town soon after, but comes back to steal his daughter. He later changes his mind and gives Josslyn back, but when he tries to leave town, Sonny sabotages his plane, angry that Brenda left him after he framed Jax. Jax's plane crashes, and he is presumed dead. However, he manages to sneak out, and gets Skye to help him skip town. He overhears Carly say that she wants to cut Sonny out of her life, and leaves knowing Josslyn is safe with Carly.

Jax is seen sporadically by Michael and Carly until he shows up in Port Charles when Carly contacts him after Josslyn is hospitalized with a strange illness. Jax comes back in time to see Josslyn recover and find out Jerry has poisoned the Port Charles water supply in order to gain a ransom. He inoculates Josslyn against the poison, and tries to keep Jax away by having him detained at the airport. Jax, though, finds his way to Port Charles, and helps pay the ransom Jerry demands in order to get the cure. Jax tries to detain Jerry, but he is presumed dead in an explosion. Jax gets cured, and leaves town. He comes back for the Nurses' Ball being held in honor of Robin, and lets Carly know their divorce was never finalized. He reveals he's now engaged to Brenda, but Carly believes Brenda is still holding onto Sonny. Carly hands Jax their divorce papers, but also lets him know Brenda went to see Sonny, though Brenda claimed she didn't. Brenda later admits to Jax that she was wondering if she still had a chance with Sonny, and Jax broke off their engagement and left town.

Jax returns in late 2016 for Morgan's funeral and again in early 2017 to tell Josslyn that his mother died.

See also
 Supercouple

References

External links
Jasper Jacks @ ABC.com
Jasper "Jax" Jacks on General Hospital - Soaps.com

General Hospital characters
Fictional businesspeople
Fictional characters from Alaska
Fictional Australian people
Television characters introduced in 1996
Male characters in television